Toomas Tiru (born 18 January 1969) is an Estonian skier. He competed in the Nordic combined event at the 1992 Winter Olympics.

References

External links
 

1969 births
Living people
Estonian male Nordic combined skiers
Olympic Nordic combined skiers of Estonia
Estonian male biathletes
Nordic combined skiers at the 1992 Winter Olympics
Sportspeople from Viljandi